Ignacio Gutiérrez may refer to:
José Ignacio Gutiérrez, (born 1977), Spanish cyclist
Ignacio Gutiérrez (swimmer) (1913–?), Mexican swimmer
Ignacio Gutiérrez (journalist) (born 1976), Chilean journalist